Charles or Charlie or Charley Davidson may refer to:

 Sir Charles Davidson (politician) (1897–1985), Australian politician
 Sir Charles Peers Davidson (1841–1929), Canadian lawyer and judge
 Charles Davidson (aviator) (1896–1936), British World War I flying ace
 Charles Davidson (watercolour painter) (1824–1902), British watercolour painter
 Charles Findlay Davidson (1911–1967), Scottish geologist
 Charles Davidson (bishop), Bishop of Guyana since 2015
 Charlie Davidson (born 1972), American football player
 Charley Davidson (fl. 1940s), American baseball player